Eugene McEntee (born 1978 in Portumna, County Galway, Ireland) is an Irish former sportsperson. He played hurling with his local club Portumna and was a member of the Galway senior inter-county team in 2009. McEntee captained Portumna to the All-Ireland title in 2006.

References

1978 births
Living people
Portumna hurlers